The crested doradito (Pseudocolopteryx sclateri) is a species of bird in the family Tyrannidae.

It is found in Argentina, Bolivia, Brazil, Guyana, Paraguay, Trinidad and Tobago, Uruguay, and Venezuela.

Its natural habitat is swamps.

References

crested doradito
Birds of South America
crested doradito
Taxonomy articles created by Polbot